Aynikabmakhi (Dargwa: ГIяйнихъяб) is a rural locality (a selo) in Akushinsky Selsoviet, Akushinsky District, Republic of Dagestan, Russia. The population was 381 as of 2010. There are 9 streets.

Geography 
Aynikabmakhi is located 4 km southeast of Akusha (the district's administrative centre) by road. Inzimakhi is the nearest rural locality.

References 

Rural localities in Akushinsky District